"How the West Was Won and Where It Got Us" is a song by R.E.M. released as the fourth and final single from their tenth studio album New Adventures in Hi-Fi in 1997. It was released in Germany and Japan was the final R.E.M. single and music video to feature Bill Berry until "#9 Dream" in 2007.

The primary B-side was an alternate recording of "Be Mine". Other B-sides for the maxi-single include a cover of The Troggs' "Love Is All Around," previously released on the soundtrack for I Shot Andy Warhol (1996) and Vic Chesnutt's "Sponge", previously released on the Chesnutt benefit album Sweet Relief II (1996). The track was performed live only throughout various shows during promotion of Up in 1998 and 1999.

Track listing
All songs were written by Bill Berry, Peter Buck, Mike Mills, and Michael Stipe unless otherwise indicated.
 "How the West Was Won and Where It Got Us" – 4:30
 "Be Mine" (Mike on the Bus version) – 4:54
 "Love Is All Around" (Reg Presley) – 3:04
 "Sponge" (Vic Chesnutt) – 4:08

Personnel
"How the West Was Won and Where It Got Us"
 Bill Berry – drums, tambourine, Ennio whistle
 Peter Buck – bass guitar, guitar, bouzouki, mandolin
 Mike Mills – piano, synthesizer, backing vocals
 Michael Stipe – vocals, synthesizer

References

1996 songs
1997 singles
Music videos directed by Lance Bangs
R.E.M. songs
Song recordings produced by Bill Berry
Song recordings produced by Michael Stipe
Song recordings produced by Mike Mills
Song recordings produced by Peter Buck
Song recordings produced by Scott Litt
Songs written by Bill Berry
Songs written by Michael Stipe
Songs written by Mike Mills
Songs written by Peter Buck
Warner Records singles